Tarassothrips is a genus of thrips in the family Phlaeothripidae.

Species
 Temenothrips flavillus
 Temenothrips nigricans
 Temenothrips oblongus

References

Phlaeothripidae
Thrips
Thrips genera